The following is a list of Dutch poets.

A
Bertus Aafjes  
Gerrit Achterberg
Anne van Amstel
Hans Andreus
Reyer Anslo 
Jan Arends (Jan [Johannes Cornelis] Arends)
Armando
Bernardo Ashetu

B
Barlaeus (Kaspar van Baerle)
Maria Barnas
Jacobus Bellamy
Charles Beltjens
M. H. Benders 
Nel Benschop
Joost Berman
J. Bernlef
Anna Bijns
Willem Bilderdijk 
Jan Boerstoel  
Louis Paul Boon
Joan van Broekhuizen
C. Buddingh'

C
Jan Campert 
Remco Campert 
Jacob Cats
Bart Chabot 
Hugo Claus
Isaäc da Costa

D
Maria van Daalen
Jan Michiel Dautzenberg
Jules Deelder
Aagje Deken 
F. van Dixhoorn
Hans Dorrestijn
Bart FM Droog

E
Margriet Ehlen
Willem Elsschot
Anna Enquist

F
Hans Faverey
Willem Godschalck van Focquenbroch

G
Eva Gerlach
Guido Gezelle 
Herman Gorter

H
Haan, Jacob Israël de 
Hadewijch
Jan Hanlo
Elma van Haren
Jan Frederik Helmers
Toon Hermans 
Judith Herzberg
Rozalie Hirs 
Pieter 't Hoen
Pieter Corneliszoon Hooft 
Jotie T'Hooft 
Constantijn Huygens

J
 Esther Jansma

K
Jan Kal
Willem Kloos 
Hester Knibbe
Antoine de Kom
Gerrit Komrij
Gerrit Krol

L
Cynthia Lenige
Lucebert (Lubertus Jacobus Swaanswijk)
Gerry van der Linden

M
Jacob van Maerlant
Paul Marijnis
Hendrik Marsman
Vonne van der Meer
Lucretia Wilhelmina van Merken
Erik Menkveld
Willem de Mérode (Willem Eduard Keuning)
Saul van Messel (Jaap Meijer)
Hanny Michaelis
Judith Mok

N

Nescio (J.H.F. Grönloh)
Martinus Nijhoff

O
Paul van Ostaijen
Willem Jan Otten

P
Piet Paaltjens (François HaverSchmidt)
Ester Naomi Perquin
Ilja Leonard Pfeijffer
Hugo Pos

R
Albrecht Rodenbach
Astrid Roemer
Hannie Rouweler

S
Annie M.G. Schmidt 
Anna Maria van Schurman
Johannes Secundus
 Shrinivási
J. Slauerhoff
Michaël Slory
Pem Sluijter
Albertina Soepboer
Lucienne Stassaert

V
Adriaen Valerius 
M. Vasalis (Margaretha Droogleever Fortuyn-Leenmans)
Martinus Veltman
André Verbart
Peter Verhelst
Albert Verwey 
Simon Vestdijk 
Simon Vinkenoog 
Eddy van Vliet 
Joost van den Vondel 
Ida Vos
Hendrik de Vries  
Leo Vroman

W
Willem die Madocke maecte
Elly de Waard
Willem Wilmink
Ans Wortel

References

Dutch

poets